"Great Wall" is a song by Australian rock band Boom Crash Opera. It was the first single from their self-titled 1987 album, and reached number five on the Australian music charts.
Great Wall's lyrics reference the New South Wales Hume Weir (Dam).

At the 1986 Countdown Australian Music Awards the song won Best Debut single.

Track listing
 7" single (7.258695)
 "Great Wall" (Dale Ryder) - 3:46
 "Caught Between Two Towns" (Peter Farnan) - 3:23

Charts

Weekly charts

Year-end charts

Personnel 
 Drums – Peter Maslen
 Engineer – Chris Corr
 Guitar – Peter Farnan
 Guitar, Bass – Richard Pleasance
 Keyboards – Greg O'Connor
 Mastered By – Paul Ibbotson
 Vocals – Dale Ryder

References

External links 
Boom Crash Opera - Great Wall (7" single)
Boom Crash Opera - Great Wall (12" single)

1986 debut singles
1986 songs
Boom Crash Opera songs
Songs written by Richard Pleasance